A handcycle is a type of human-powered land vehicle powered by the arms rather than the legs, as on a bicycle.  Most handcycles are tricycle in form, with two coasting rear wheels and one steerable powered front wheel. Despite usually having three wheels, they are also known as handbikes.

Origin

Stephan Farffler was a Nuremberg watchmaker of the seventeenth century whose invention of a manumotive carriage in 1655 is widely considered to have been the first self-propelled bicycle. He is believed to have been either a paraplegic or an amputee. The three-wheeled device is believed to have been a precursor to the modern-day tricycle and bicycle.

Description
Many manufacturers have designed and released hand-powered recumbent trikes, or handcycles. Handcycles are a regular sight at HPV meets and are beginning to be seen on the streets. They commonly follow a delta design with front wheels driven by standard derailleur gearing powered by hand cranks. Brake levers are usually mounted on the handholds which are usually mounted in phase, unlike pedal cranks, which are usually 180° out of phase. This allows the rider to more easily use their torso to help propel the cycle. The entire crank assembly and the front wheel turn together, allowing the rider to steer and crank simultaneously.

Some designs use two front wheels and a single rear wheel, while others use lean-steer designs.

A handcycle is not a wheelchair; a handcycle has a crank and gears, while a wheelchair has push-rims directly on the main wheels.

Styles

Handcycles come in a variety of styles, making them accessible to people with a wide variety of disabilities. There are also hybrids between a handcycle, a recumbent bike and a tricycle.

Fork steer
Fork steer handcycles represent the majority of handcycles sold. They work well for both low and high-level spinal injuries, and most have adjustable footrests, seat angle, and come with a variety of gearing, wheel and tire configurations depending on intended use: racing, recreation, or touring.  Manufacturers of this type of handcycle include Invacare (Top End), Intrepid Equipment, Varna, Schmicking and Sunrise Medical (Quickie).

Lean steer
Riders turn lean steer handcycles by leaning into the turn. There is a longer learning curve with lean steer handcycles and they are significantly less stable at high speed. The lean steer system feels similar to mono skiing: using your whole body to steer the handcycle. Lean steer handcycles can work well for lower-level injuries; although, some athletes with high-level disability use them as well. Manufacturers of this type of handcycle include Lighting Handcycles and Brike International Ltd. (Freedom Ryder).

Another type of lean steer hand trike has two steering rear wheels and one non-steerable, powered front wheel with handholds offset at 180°, similar to pedal cranks, that can be operated with only one hand, thus making it easy to ride uphill, and it can be ridden in a tighter curve with the automatic rear wheels steering system.

Off road
The off-road is different from other handcycles in that there are two wheels in front and one behind, and it has a lower gear ratio range.  This gives the cycle the ability to tackle steep slopes and permits handcycle mountain biking.  The addition of a wider tire with suitable tread makes some mountain biking possible on standard road bikes.

Touring
Handcycles have also been used for touring, and to better accommodate this interest, some manufacturers incorporate mudguards and pannier cargo racks. As handcycles have evolved they have become progressively lighter, and they have better gearing for long climbs and long-distance touring.

Racing
Racing handcycles tend to be extremely low to the ground to minimize air drag and maximize the lateral acceleration that can be generated in a turn without rolling over to the outside.

Wheelchair conversion
An attachment, consisting of a steerable front wheel and crank, can convert a wheelchair into a handcycle.

Gallery

See also 

 Bicycle
 Cycling at the Summer Paralympics
 Invalid carriage
 Para-cycling
 Outline of cycling
 Quadracycle (human-powered vehicle)
 Racerunning
 Recumbent bicycle
 Rowing cycle
 Tricycle

References 

Mobility devices
Human-powered vehicles